Governor Clinton may refer to:

Clinton Clauson (1895–1959), 66th Governor of Maine
Bill Clinton (born 1946), 40th and 42nd Governor of Arkansas
DeWitt Clinton (1769–1828), 6th Governor of New York
George Clinton (vice president) (1739–1812), 1st Governor of New York
George Clinton (Royal Navy officer) (1680s–1761), Commodore Governor of Newfoundland in 1731 and Governor of the Province of New York from 1741 to 1753